MycoBank is an online database, documenting new mycological names and combinations, eventually combined with descriptions and illustrations. It is run by the Westerdijk Fungal Biodiversity Institute in Utrecht.

Each novelty, after being screened by nomenclatural experts and found in accordance with the ICN (International Code of Nomenclature for algae, fungi, and plants), is allocated a unique MycoBank number before the new name has been validly published. This number then can be cited by the naming author in the publication where the new name is being introduced. Only then, this unique number becomes public in the database.

By doing so, this system can help solve the problem of knowing which names have been validly published and in which year.

MycoBank is linked to other important mycological databases such as Index Fungorum, Life Science Identifiers, Global Biodiversity Information Facility (GBIF) and other databases. MycoBank is one of three nomenclatural repositories recognized by the Nomenclature Committee for Fungi; the others are Index Fungorum and Fungal Names.

References

Further reading

External links

 

Mycology
Online taxonomy databases